The following ships of the Indian Navy have been named INS Nilgiri:

  was a  launched in 1972
  is a  launched in 2022

Indian Navy ship names